The 2010–11 Welsh Football League Division One began on 1 September 2010 and ended on 28 May 2011. Bryntirion Athletic won the league by five points.

Team changes from 2009–10
Caerau (Ely), Cwmbran Celtic and Penrhiwceiber Rangers were promoted from the Welsh Football League Division Two.

Bettws, Caerleon, Dinas Powys, Ely Rangers and Ton Pentre were relegated to the Welsh Football League Division Two.

League table

Results

External links
 Welsh Football League

Welsh Football League Division One seasons
2010–11 in Welsh football leagues